Podolsky Uyezd (Подольский уезд) was one of the subdivisions of the Moscow Governorate of the Russian Empire. It was situated in the southern part of the governorate. Its administrative centre was Podolsk.

Demographics
At the time of the Russian Empire Census of 1897, Podolsky Uyezd had a population of 86,311. Of these, 99.2% spoke Russian, 0.3% Polish, 0.1% Tatar, 0.1% German, 0.1% Ukrainian and 0.1% Yiddish as their native language.

References

 
Uezds of Moscow Governorate
Moscow Governorate